Frederick Homer Wase was a Canadian Anglican priest in the 20th Century.

Wase was  ordained in 1924. After a curacy at Christ's Church Cathedral, Hamilton, Ontario he held incumbencies at Glen Williams, Guelph. and  Dunnville. He was   Archdeacon of Haldimand and Wentworth from 1955 to 1960.

References

Archdeacons of Wentworth, ON
20th-century Canadian Anglican priests